Caproberyx is an extinct genus of ray-finned fish from the Cretaceous period of Africa and Europe. It has also been found in Kansas, USA.

References
 Fishes of the World by Joseph S. Nelson
 Kansas Geology: An Introduction to Landscapes, Rocks, Minerals, and Fossils by Rex Buchanan

Prehistoric ray-finned fish genera
Cretaceous bony fish
Prehistoric fish of Africa
Cretaceous fish of Europe
Cretaceous fish of North America
Natural history of Kansas
Beryciformes
Fossil taxa described in 1911